The Anglican dioceses of Northern Uganda are the Anglican presence in (roughly) the Northern Region, Uganda; they are part of the Church of Uganda. The remaining dioceses of the Church are in the areas of Buganda, of Eastern Uganda, of Ankole and Kigezi, and of Rwenzori.

Diocese of Northern Uganda
The first diocese to be erected in this area was that called simply the Diocese of Northern Uganda, which was split from the Diocese on the Upper Nile in 1961. Today the mother church is St Philip's Cathedral, Gulu.

Bishops of Northern Uganda
19611964/5: Keith Russell (previously an assistant bishop on the Upper Nile)
1964–1966: Silvanus Wani, assistant bishop
bef. Jan 19661969: Silvanus Wani (became Bishop of Madi and West Nile)
1969–1974: Janani Luwum (became Archbishop of Uganda, Rwanda, Burundi and Boga-Zaire)
19741989 (res.): Benoni Ogwal (in exile 1977–1980)
Allan Oboma, assistant bishop
19891998 (ret.): Allan Oboma
19982009 (ret.): Nelson Onono-Onweng
20 December 2009present: Bishop Godfrey Loum

Diocese of Madi—West Nile

Erected from Northern Uganda diocese in 1969; See at Emmanuel Cathedral, Mvara (near Arua).

Bishops of Madi—West Nile
19691977: Silvanus Wani (became Archbishop of Uganda, Rwanda, Burundi and Boga-Zaire)
?1987: Remelia Ringtho
19881990 (d.): Ephraim Adrale
?1994 (d.): Ariaka Nguma
19952005 (ret.): Lee Drati
26 November 2005?: Joel Obetia
26 February 2017present: Collins Andaku

Diocese of Karamoja
Split in 1976 from the Diocese of Soroti; St Philip's Cathedral, Moroto.

Bishops of Karamoja
19761981 (res.): Brian Herd (previously Archdeacon of Karamoja; consecrated 11 January 1976, by Janani Luwum, Archbishop of Uganda, Rwanda, Burundi and Boga-Zaire, at Namirembe Cathedral; exiled March 1977?)
1981–?: Howell Davies
1987June 2006 (d.): Peter Lomongin
27 May 2007present: Joseph Abura (consecrated 27 May 2007)

Diocese of Lango
Erected from Northern Uganda, 1976; Lira Cathedral.

Bishops of Lango
19762001: Melkizedek Otim (consecrated 11 January 1976, by Janani Luwum, Archbishop of Uganda, Rwanda, Burundi and Boga-Zaire, at Namirembe Cathedral)
2001–2017 (ret.): Charles Odurkami
13 August 2017present: Alfred Olwa

Diocese of Nebbi
Created in 1993 from the Diocese of Madi—West Nile; St Stephen's Cathedral, Goli.

Bishops of Nebbi
1993–2004: Henry Luke Orombi
2004–present: Alphonse Watho-kudi

Diocese of Kitgum
Created in 1995  from Northern Uganda diocese; the See is Kitgum, where stands All Saints' Cathedral.

Bishops of Kitgum
1995–2002 (ret.): Baker Ochola
2002–2014 (ret.): Benjamin Ojwang
2018–present: Wilson Kitara

Diocese of North Karamoja
Christ Church Cathedral, Kotido is the mother church of this diocese, erected from Karamoja in 2007.

Bishops of North Karamoja
1 July 2007?: James Nasak

Diocese of West Lango
Split from Lango diocese, 2014; St Peter's Cathedral, Aduku.

Bishops of West Lango
2014–2018: Alfred Acur
2019–present: Julius Nina

See also
 Anglican dioceses of Ankole and Kigezi
 Anglican dioceses of Buganda
 Anglican dioceses of Eastern Uganda
 Anglican dioceses of Rwenzori
 List of Roman Catholic dioceses in Uganda

References

Church of Uganda